Elidon is a 1985 action game developed and published by Orpheus for the Amstrad CPC, Commodore 64, and MSX computers.

Gameplay

Reception

Elidon was well received by press, including review scores of 78% from Amtix, 15/20 from Computer Gamer, and 83% from Zzap!64.

References

External links
Elidon at MobyGames

1985 video games
Action-adventure games
Amstrad CPC games
Commodore 64 games
Fantasy video games
MSX games
Single-player video games
Video games developed in the United Kingdom
Video games featuring female protagonists